Partenit is a seaside urban-type settlement under the administrative jurisdiction of the town of regional significance of Alushta in the southern part of the Autonomous Republic of Crimea, a territory recognized by a majority of countries as part of Ukraine and incorporated by Russia as the Republic of Crimea. Population:  

Lying just east of a mountain which Turkish speakers named Ayu Dağ (which means Bear Mountain), Partenit is on a fairly flat coastal plot of land, although the elevation quickly rises the further away one goes from the sea. Much of the architecture of the city is in the Soviet realist style. The current permanent-resident population is largely Russian Ukrainian, with a significant influx of Tatars and Armenians.

History
Originally an ancient Greek settlement named Parthenium, the name derived from the word Parthenon. It had been subsequently settled or invaded by, Goths, Turks, Genoese, Tatars, and Germans. It is in wine country; the nearby Massandra winery is famous for its production of Bastardo and other wines.

Tourist attraction
Partenit has two beaches. One is the public beach which is free. The other is on the property of the military resort and much bigger. Most tourists rent an apartment from a local renter, and the going rate in recent years has been about $20/day for an apartment within a 10-minute walk of the beach.

There are several businesses offering excursions, set up for tourists between the bazaar and the beach, to different parts of Crimea, including to Massandra and Livadia, as well as waterfalls. A local tour goes through Ayu Dag, tracing its history through earthquakes and past ruins of ancient churches of the Goths. One of the first national parks in Ukraine was established to protect Ayu Dag.

References

External links
 

Alushta Municipality
Urban-type settlements in Crimea
Seaside resorts in Russia
Seaside resorts in Ukraine
Tourist attractions in Crimea